Buqajeh-ye Bala (also Romanized as Būqājeh-ye Bālā) is a village in Golidagh Rural District, Golidagh District, Maraveh Tappeh County, Golestan Province, Iran. At the 2006 census, its population was 644, in 121 families.

References 

Populated places in Maraveh Tappeh County